Landry is a commune in the Savoie department in the Auvergne-Rhône-Alpes region in south-eastern France. As of 2018, there are 821 inhabitants.

The Martorey
The Martorey is a hamlet situated in 1150 meters in height above the city of Landry. We find a tourist accommodation built there in 1800 as well as several chalets Savoyard typical stone.

See also
Communes of the Savoie department

References

External links

Official site

Communes of Savoie